The 2012 BWF Super Series Finals was a top level badminton competition which was held from December 12 to December 16, 2012 in Shenzhen, China. The final was held by Chinese Badminton Association and sponsored by China Resources Land. It was the final event of the BWF Super Series competition on the 2012 BWF Super Series schedule. The total purse for the event was $500,000.

Representatives by nation

§: Christinna Pedersen from Denmark, Zhao Yunlei from China and Jang Ye-na from Korea were the players who played in two categories (women's doubles and mixed doubles).

Performance by nation

Men's singles

Group A

Note: Lee Chong Wei withdrew due to injury.

Group B

Finals

Women's singles

Group A

Group B

Finals

Men's doubles

Group A

Note: Kim Ki-jung/Kim Sa-rang withdrew from the competition.

Group B

Finals

Women's doubles

Group A

Group B

Note: Eom Hye-won/Jang Ye-na withdrew due to injury of Jang Ye-na

Finals

Mixed doubles

Group A

Note: Yoo Yeon-seong/Jang Ye-na withdrew due to injury of Jang Ye-na

Group B

Finals

References

External links
BWF World Superseries Finals 2012 at tournamentsoftware.com

BWF World Superseries Finals
Masters Finals
2012 BWF World Superseries Finals
BWF Super Series Finals
December 2012 sports events in China